Guido Ruggiero is a notable microhistorian and professor and chair of the University of Miami History Department. His most notable work is Binding Passions: Tales of Magic, Marriage and Power from the End of the Renaissance.

Works
 Violence in Early Renaissance Venice (1980)
 The Boundaries of Eros: Sex Crime and Sexuality in Renaissance Venice (1985)
 Binding Passions: Tales of Magic, Marriage and Power from the End of the Renaissance (1993)
 Machiavelli in Love: Sex, Self and Society in Renaissance Italy (2007)
 Sex and Gender in Historical Perspectives (1990)
 Microhistory and the Lost Peoples of Europe (1991)
 History from Crime (1993), edited with Edward Muir.
 The Blackwell Companion to the Renaissance (2002), editor
 Five Comedies from the Italian Renaissance (2003), edited and translated with Laura Giannetti
 Studies in the History of Sexuality (1985–2002), editor
 Encyclopedia of European Social History (2002), co-editor
The Renaissance in Italy: A Social and Cultural History of the Rinascimento  (2014)

References

See also
 Microhistory

Historians of the Renaissance
Living people
Microhistorians
University of California, Los Angeles alumni
University of Colorado alumni
University of Miami faculty
Year of birth missing (living people)